Whitland Area Neighborhood is a historic neighborhood in Nashville, Tennessee. It was listed on the National Register of Historic Places listings in Davidson County, Tennessee (NRHP) in 2007.

History
The neighborhood was developed in the 1920s and is approximately 15 minutes from downtown Nashville. The private boys school Montgomery Bell Academy, and Elmington Park are both in the neighborhood. The neighborhood boundaries are Whitland Avenue to Bowling Ave and S. Wilson Boulevard, to Richland Creek. In 1980 John walker established a nonprofit organization called the Whitland Area Neighborhood Association. The mission of the association was to create a sense of community, prevent crime, beautify the area, control traffic, and deal with zoning issues. The association also coordinates events and holds regular meetings and social gatherings. 

The Whitland Area Neighborhood was added to the National Register of Historic Places listings in Davidson County, Tennessee on July 24, 2007.

References

1900 establishments in Tennessee
National Register of Historic Places in Nashville, Tennessee
Historic districts on the National Register of Historic Places in Tennessee
Neighborhoods in Nashville, Tennessee
Populated places in Davidson County, Tennessee